William Alexander Harris (August 24, 1805 – March 28, 1864) was a Virginia lawyer and politician who served as a U.S. Representative from Virginia.

Early and family life

Born near Warrenton, Virginia, Harris completed an academic course which included the study of law. He married and had children. His firstborn son, also William Alexander Harris would be educated in Washington D.C. and at the Virginia Military Institute, volunteered for Confederate States Army service, and after serving in various mostly staff positions during the war, moved to Kansas and became a railroad official, as well as continued his father's political tradition, winning election to the U.S. Congress as a Populist, and later serving in the Kansas state senate. His other son Murray Harris (1848-1923) moved to Texas after the conflict, but their sister, Leilia Harris Robinson (1857-1914), married a local Missouri lawyer turned judge and railroad attorney.

Career
He was admitted to the bar and commenced practice in the 1820s in Luray, Virginia. Harris may have been one of the fifteen original men to have thoroughly explored the Luray Cave in 1825. The Shenandoah Herald printed an article he had written in that year, which seems the first to describing the site, which later became a tourist attraction. Voters elected him as their delegate to the Virginia House of Delegates from 1830–1831, and he sponsored the bill to create Page County, Virginia. He then became the new county's first Clerk of the Court of Page County, beginning 23 May 1831, and also served as the local Commonwealth's attorney (prosecutor) and as one of the commissioners to oversee the construction of the county offices. In September, 1837, the elder Harris continued in his multi-faceted roles and was responsible for donations for the opening of a road east through the Blue Ridge at Milam's Gap. In 1840, Harris became a Presidential elector on the Van Buren-Johnson ticket.

Harris resigned his position as Clerk of the Court after winning election as a Democrat to the Twenty-seventh Congress (March 4, 1841 – March 3, 1843). The previous Congressman, Green Berry Samuels, had accepted a position on the Virginia Court of Appeals (later Virginia Supreme Court).

Before his retiring to private life the elder Harris held several other positions including editor of the Spectator and The Constitution in Washington, D.C., and also chargé d'affaires to the Argentine Republic from 1846-1851. He moved to Pike County, Missouri and later returned to Washington, D.C. as editor of the Washington Union and printer to the United States Senate, 1857-1859.

Death and legacy
Harris died in Pike County, Missouri, March 28, 1864 and was interred in Riverview Cemetery, Louisiana, Missouri.

References

Sources

 Moore, Robert H. II, Short Historical Sketches of Page County, Virginia and Its People, Volume 2 ("The Harris family in Page County"); Heritage Books, Inc., 2005, pp. 193–194.

External links
William Alexander Harris at Find A Grave

1805 births
1864 deaths
People from Fauquier County, Virginia
Democratic Party members of the United States House of Representatives from Virginia
Democratic Party members of the Virginia House of Delegates
Ambassadors of the United States to Argentina
Virginia lawyers
American male journalists
Journalists from Virginia
People from Page County, Virginia
People from Pike County, Missouri
19th-century American lawyers
19th-century American male writers
19th-century American politicians
19th-century American diplomats
19th-century American newspaper editors